Clinamen (plural clinamina, derived from clīnāre, to incline) is the Latin name Lucretius gave to the unpredictable swerve of atoms, in order to defend the atomistic doctrine of Epicurus. In modern English it has come more generally to mean an inclination or a bias.

Epicureanism
According to Lucretius, the unpredictable swerve occurs "at no fixed place or time":
When atoms move straight down through the void by their own weight, they deflect a bit in space at a quite uncertain time and in uncertain places, just enough that you could say that their motion has changed. But if they were not in the habit of swerving, they would all fall straight down through the depths of the void, like drops  of rain, and no collision would occur, nor would any blow be produced among the atoms. In that case, nature would never have produced anything.

This swerving, according to Lucretius, provides the "free will which living things throughout the world have". Lucretius never gives the primary cause of the deflections.

Modern usage
In modern English clinamen is defined as an inclination or a bias. It implies that one is inclined or biased towards introducing a plausible but unprovable clinamen when a specific mechanism cannot be found to refute a credible argument against one's hypothesis or theory. The OED gives its first recorded use in English by Jonathan Swift in his 1704 Tale of a Tub ix.166, satirizing the atomistic theory of Epicurus:
Epicurus modestly hoped that one time or other, a certain fortuitous concourse of all men's opinions—after perpetual justlings, the sharp with the smooth, the light and the heavy, the round and the square—would, by certain clinamina, unite in the notions of atoms and void, as these did in the originals of all things.

The term was taken up by Harold Bloom to describe the inclinations of writers to "swerve" from the influence of their predecessors; it is the first of his "Ratios of Revision" as described in The Anxiety of Influence.

In Difference and Repetition, Gilles Deleuze employs the term in his description of "multiplicities".  In addition, other French writers such as Simone de Beauvoir, Jacques Lacan, Jacques Derrida, Jean-Luc Nancy, Alain Badiou, Louis Althusser, and Michel Serres have made extensive use of the word 'clinamen' in their writings, albeit with very different meanings.

Lucretius' concept is central to the book The Swerve: How the World Became Modern, written by Stephen Greenblatt.

"Clinamen" is defined by Alfred Jarry in Chapter 33 of his Exploits and Opinions of Dr. Faustroll, Pataphysician.  The notion later figured in the imaginary science of the Jarry-inspired College of Pataphysics, notably in the pataphysical calendar and the experimental literature of OuLiPo. The clinamen figures as a motif in the artistic practice of Rodney Graham – who has said it informs his work in general.

Clinamen is also a term used in systems theory applied to biology.

See also 
 Brownian motion – The random motion of particles suspended in a fluid
 Hylozoism – A philosophical point of view that holds that matter is in some sense alive
 Molecular chaos
 Panpsychism
 Quantum foam
 Shot noise

References

External links 
 Stanford Encyclopedia of Philosophy, Lucretius.

Epicureanism
Concepts in metaphysics
Atomism